The Loizaga–Cotegipe Treaty was a treaty of peace and borders signed in Asunción on 9 January 1872 between Paraguay and Brazil. It established the boundaries between the two countries after Paraguay's defeat in the Paraguayan War.

The treaty was signed by Carlos Loizaga and João Maurício Vanderlei. Ambiguity over the exact borderline between the two nations later led to dispute over the ownership of Guaíra Falls.

Despite its obligations under the Treaty of the Triple Alliance towards Argentina and Uruguay, Brazil concluded the treaty with Paraguay separately. In response, Argentina occupied Villa Occidental, to enforce its claims in Gran Chaco.

References

External links
 

History of Paraguay
1872 treaties
1872 in Brazil
January 1872 events
Brazil–Paraguay relations
Treaties of Paraguay
Treaties of the Empire of Brazil
1870s in Paraguay
Paraguayan War